The Giuseppe Sirtori class consisted of four destroyers built for the Italian  (Royal Navy) during World War I. All four ships saw action during the war, survived the post-war reduction in Italian naval strength, and were lost during World War II.

Design and description
The ships were designed as slightly improved versions of the preceding . Their crew consisted of 98 officers and enlisted men.

The Giuseppe Sirtoris were powered by two Tosi steam turbines, each driving one propeller shaft using steam supplied by four Thornycroft boilers.

Notes

References
 

 

 

 
 

 

 
Destroyer classes
Destroyers of the Regia Marina
World War I naval ships of Italy
World War II destroyers of Italy
Ships built by Cantieri navali Odero